Falling Home is the ninth studio album by Swedish band Pain of Salvation, released on November 10, 2014, by InsideOut. Falling Home is an acoustic album, featuring acoustic versions of previous work, covers of Dio and Lou Reed and the self-titled track.

Track listing
Concept, music and lyrics by Daniel Gildenlöw, except where noted.

Standard Edition

Limited Edition Digipack
Stress (Gildenlöw/Magdic) - 05:32
Linoleum - 04:57
To The Shoreline - 03:05
Holy Diver (Dio) - 04:34
1979 - 02:50
She Likes To Hide - 02:57
Chain Sling - 04:07
Perfect Day (Lou Reed) - 04:51
Spitfall - 06:42
Mrs. Modern Mother Mary - 04:23
Flame To The Moth - 04:30
King Of Loss - 07:12
Falling Home (Gildenlöw/Zolberg) - 03:05

Personnel
Daniel Gildenlöw - lead vocals, acoustic guitars
Ragnar Zolberg - acoustic guitars, vocals
Gustaf Hielm - acoustic basses, upright bass, vocals
Daniel "D2" Karlsson - rhodes, organs, vocals
Léo Margarit - drums, vocals

External links
Inside Out Announcement 

Pain of Salvation albums
2014 albums
Inside Out Music albums